Wood River Rural Schools is a school district based in Wood River, Nebraska, United States.

Schools
Wood River Elementary School
Wood River Middle School
Wood River High School

References

External links

School districts in Nebraska
Education in Hall County, Nebraska